Clerget was the name given to a series of early rotary aircraft engine types of the World War I era that were designed by Pierre Clerget. Manufactured in France by Clerget-Blin and in Great Britain by Gwynnes Limited they were used on such aircraft as the Sopwith Camel and Vickers Gunbus.

In the 1920s Pierre Clerget turned his attention to diesel radial engines and finally produced a H-16 engine before he died in 1943.

Rotary engine development (spark ignition)

What distinguished the Clerget rotary engine from its rivals (Gnome and Le Rhône) was that the Clerget had normal intake and exhaust valves unlike the Gnome, and the connecting rod arrangement was much simpler than the Le Rhone. A source of failure among the Clerget engines were the special-purpose piston rings, called  obturator rings. These were located below the gudgeon or wrist pin, to block heat transfer from the combustion area to the lower part of the cylinder and overcome their subsequent distortion.  These rings were often made from brass and only had a lifespan of a few hours.  The Clerget engines were considered reliable but they cost more per unit to produce than their rivals. Unlike other contemporary rotaries in which the ignition system was either switched on or off to provide a rudimentary form of engine speed control, the Clerget featured a throttle.

The Bentley BR1 and Bentley BR2 rotaries were designed as improvements of the Clerget, while sharing some of the earlier engine's distinctive design features.

Design features
The Clerget rotary engines were air-cooled with either seven, nine or eleven cylinders. They were fitted with a double thrust ball race, which enabled them to be used either as a pusher or as a tractor engine.

The engines worked on a four-stroke cycle. The chief points of difference from other rotary engines were:
 The pistons were of an aluminium alloy.
 The connecting rods had a tubular section.
 The inlet and exhaust valves were mechanically operated by means of separate cams, tappets and rocker arms.

The direction of rotation was counter (anti)-clockwise as seen from the propeller-end of the engine. Between any two consecutive firing strokes, the engine turned through 80 degrees. Like many other rotary engines of the period they were made chiefly of steel, for strength and lightness.

Rotary engine types
Clerget 7Y
(1912) , seven-cylinder.
Clerget 7Z
(1911) , seven-cylinder.
Clerget 9A
(1914)  , nine-cylinder derivative of 7Z. (designation reused for radial)
Clerget 9B
(1915) , nine-cylinder. (designation reused for radial)
Clerget 9Bf
(1915) , nine-cylinder long stroke version of the Clerget 9B. The most numerous British production engine with 2,350 units being built.
Clerget 9J
(1917) , nine-cylinder. Redesigned with aluminium pistons, tubular connecting rods and revised valve gear.
Clerget 9Z
(1915)  , nine-cylinder.
Clerget 11Eb
(1918) , 11-cylinder, single-row engine.

Rotary engines on display
A locally-built Clerget 9B of 1917 is displayed at the Museum of Lincolnshire Life.
A preserved Clerget 9B engine is on public display at the Fleet Air Arm Museum, RNAS Yeovilton.

Operational rotary engines
The Shuttleworth Collection based at Old Warden Aerodrome in the UK, operate an airworthy late production Sopwith Triplane (G-BOCK) fitted with an original 9B as well as an airworthy late production Sopwith Camel (G-BZSC) fitted with an original long-stroke 9Bf. These aircraft can be seen displaying at home air displays through the summer months.

Radial 'X' engines
Clerget 16X

A 420 hp (310 kW) 16-cylinder, four-row X engine.

Diesel radial engines

In the 1920s Pierre Clerget designed static diesel radial engines, the earliest were based on his rotary designs.
Clerget 9A (1929) 100 hp (75 kW) Nine-cylinder, single row radial engine.
Clerget 9B
Clerget 9C Produced under licence by Hispano-Suiza as the Hispano-Suiza 9T
Clerget 14F-01 (1937) 14-cylinder, two-row radial engine, flown in a Potez 25 biplane.
Clerget 14F-02
Clerget 14Fcs

16H engine
Clerget's final engine design was a V-16 designated Clerget 16H and known as the Type Transatlantique. It developed 2,000 hp (1,500 kW) through the use of four Rateau turbochargers.

See also 
List of aircraft engines

References 

 "Air Board" Technical Notes issued by Controller Technical Department for persons holding an official position in His Majesty's Service  dated 1918

External links 

Image and description of aClerget 9B rotary engine
A Clerget-Blin 9Bf, Gwynnes Ltd, at Powerhouse Museum, Sydney, Australia
Clerget engine details and type listings (French)

 
Air-cooled aircraft piston engines
1910s aircraft piston engines
Rotary aircraft piston engines
Aircraft radial diesel engines